Republic of the Congo Civil War may refer to:
Republic of the Congo Civil War (1993–1994)
Republic of the Congo Civil War (1997–1999)